Danny Kane (born 23 April 1997) is an Irish professional footballer who plays as a defender, most recently for League of Ireland Premier Division side Sligo Rovers. He previously played for EFL Championship side Huddersfield Town at youth level, before going on to play for Cork City and AFC Fylde (loan).

Kane has represented the Republic of Ireland national side at each underage level, most recently at Under-21 level.

Club career

Huddersfield Town

On 16 February 2013, Kane signed for English Premier League side Huddersfield Town as an academy scholar. Kane joined the Huddersfield Town Academy Under-18 squad for the start of the 2013-14 Season. In his first season at the club, Kane was a member of the Huddersfield Under-18 side that won the U18 Professional Development League 2 North Division and national titles. He was also part of the same side which reached the Quarter Final stage of the 2013–14 FA Youth Cup defeating the Manchester United Under-18 side en route.

During his second season as an academy scholar, Kane was an integral part of the Huddersfield Town Under-18 side that won the U18 Professional Development League 2 North Division title for the second season in succession.

Kane was a key member of the Huddersfield Town U21 side during the 2015-16 season as they won the U21 Professional Development League 2, topping the North Division and defeating Sheffield United in the national final. Kane was part of the same side which reached the semifinal stage of the 2015–16 Under-21 Premier League Cup.

2017–18 Season

Kane made his first team debut for Huddersfield Town in a 3-1 pre-season friendly win over Bury F.C. during July 2017. Kane played for the Huddersfield Town U21 side (Development Squad) up until January 2018, at which point he departed the club.

Cork City
On 24 January 2018, Kane departed Huddersfield Town following five years at the English club, to join League of Ireland Premier Division champions Cork City. Kane made his league debut for Cork City in a 1-0 home win over Dundalk at Turners Cross on 27 April 2018. Kane made his UEFA Champions League debut in the second leg of Cork City's First Qualifying Round defeat to Polish champions Legia Warsaw on 17 July 2018. Kane terminated his contract with Cork City in January 2019, having reached a mutual agreement with the club.

AFC Fylde (loan)
On 3 August 2018, Kane completed a loan transfer to AFC Fylde in the fifth tier of English football, the National League. Kane signed for the club on loan from Cork City until 14 January 2019, making six appearances during his time at the club.

Sligo Rovers
On 12 July 2019, it was announced that Kane had signed for League of Ireland Premier Division side Sligo Rovers on a contract running until October 2019. Kane made his competitive debut for the club the following day in a scoreless draw in the league at home to Waterford.

On 17 October 2019, Kane signed a new contract with Sligo Rovers for the 2020 League of Ireland Premier Division season.

On 18 March 2021, Kane signed a new contract with Sligo Rovers for the 2021 League of Ireland Premier Division season.

International career
Kane has represented the Republic of Ireland national side at U15, U16, U17, U18, U19  and most recently Under-21 (U21) level.

Kane represented Republic of Ireland at both the 2014 UEFA European Under-17 Championship elite round and 2016 UEFA European Under-19 Championship qualifiers.

Kane was named Football Association of Ireland Under-17 International Player of the Year 2014 at the FAI International Football Awards in March 2015, awarded for his performances at international level.

Honours
Individual
 FAI Under-17 International Player of the Year: 2014

Huddersfield Town Academy
U18 Professional Development League 2 North Division: 2013-14
U18 Professional Development League 2: 2013-14
U18 Professional Development League 2 North Division: 2014-15
U21 Professional Development League 2 North Division: 2015-16
U21 Professional Development League 2: 2015-16

References

External links
Danny Kane FAI profile at FAI.ie
Danny Kane profile at Sligo Rovers F.C. Website

Danny Kane profile at soccerpunter.com

1997 births
Living people
Association footballers from Dublin (city)
Republic of Ireland association footballers
Republic of Ireland youth international footballers
Association football defenders
Huddersfield Town A.F.C. players
English Football League players
Cork City F.C. players
AFC Fylde players
Sligo Rovers F.C. players
National League (English football) players
Cherry Orchard F.C. players